Aethes bistigmatus is a species of moth of the family Tortricidae. It is found in China (Jilin) and Korea.

References

bistigmatus
Moths described in 2006
Moths of Asia
Moths of Korea